Milda may refer to:

 Milda (mythology), Lithuanian goddess of love and of freedom
 Milda, Germany, a municipality in Thuringia, Germany
 Milda (gastropod), a genus of sea snails
 Milda (given name), a female given name 
 Nickname of the Freedom Monument in Riga, Latvia 
 MILDA, acronym for the Melanesian Indigenous Land Defence Alliance

lt:Milda